Ahrar Vocational School (Persian:هنرستان فنی حرفه ای احرار) (also known as Ahrar High School) is public 3-year single-sex vocational school located in Tehran Province, Iran.

Students study software, computer networking, and accounting.

See also 
 List of schools in Iran
 Education in Iran
 Lists of schools by country

References 

Vocational schools
Schools in Tehran
Boys' schools in Iran